Cupressidae is a proposed subclass of conifers comprising the orders of Araucariales and Cupressales. It was originally erected by Alexander Doweld and contained just Cupressales, in 2022 it was expanded to include Araucariales.

References 

Conifers